Simon Mckeown (born 1965) is a British artist, and lecturer at the University of Teesside. On 4 December 2010, he was named DaDaFest Artist of the Year for 2011. In 2012, he was part of the Paralympic Cultural Festival (or Unlimited Festival), as part of a focus on Disability Arts. His work was also shown at the 2013 Liberty Festival to help celebrate the anniversary of the London 2012 Paralympics.

References

External links

Interview with the BBC
Radio 2 arts show
Motion Disabled
All for Claire, an animation by Simon Mckeown

1965 births
Living people
People from Middlesbrough
Artists with disabilities